Gide Loyrette Nouel is an independent international law firm and the first to have originated in France. Its headquarters are located in Paris (15 rue de Laborde, 75008 Paris)). Though Pierre Gide's legal practice began as early as 1920, the firm was itself founded in 1957 by Gide, Jean Loyrette and Philippe Nouel after the Paris Bar (Barreau de Paris) amended its rules allowing lawyers to form associations and practice in a collective. The firm currently employs some 1,000 people, spread out over 12 offices in 11 countries. It numbers over 550 lawyers and legal consultants, including some 100 partners, covering 40 different nationalities. The firm operates as a limited liability partnership in London and as its French equivalent, an association d'avocats à responsabilité professionnelle individuelle (A.A.R.P.I.) in France.

The current Senior Partner is Xavier de Kergommeaux, the current Managing Partner is Stéphane Puel.

International strategy
In 1967, the firm launched its international practice with an office in Brussels. The firm currently maintains offices in civil law jurisdictions (such as those in Central and Eastern Europe, North Africa and Asia) as well as in those financial centers where firm clients require legal services (New York and London). To help build its international credentials, the firm retained former French foreign minister Hubert Védrine in 2003. Gide revised its international strategy in late 2010, closing its Riyadh, Abu Dhabi and Dubai offices with immediate effect. The firm announced it would also close its Prague office and Belgrade offices.

Though the firm has a large roster of foreign and multinational clients, it has also remained a French operation, representing some 38 of the CAC 40 companies.

The firm is organised into international practice groups, covering the following practice areas: Banking & Finance; Competition & International Trade; Compliance & Corporate Investigations, Dispute Resolution; Employment; Insurance, Industrial Risk & Transport; Intellectual Property & Telecommunications, Media and Technology (TMT); Mergers & Acquisitions / Corporate Law; Projects (Finance & Infrastructure); Public Law & Environment; Real Estate; Tax.

Gide Loyrette Nouel is a member of the international network Lex Mundi, which brings together more than 160 independent law firms.

Offices
Gide Loyrette Nouel has 12 offices in 11 different countries: Algiers, Beijing, Brussels, Cairo, Casablanca, Istanbul, London, New York, Paris, Shanghai, Tunis and Warsaw.

Notable clients and transactions

Advising Naval Group on the programme for 12 regionally superior submarines to Australia, together with Allens (February 2019)
Advising the Fnac Darty group on exclusive negotiations for a strategic ticketing partnership with CTS EVENTIM group (July 2019)
Advising Eurazeo Patrimoine on acquiring shares in Emerige (July 2019).
Advising Swiss Life Asset Managers on the acquisition of 72% of Terreïs' assets, the largest real estate transaction in Paris in 2019 (June 2019)
Advising the Organisation for Energy of CEPGL (EGL) and the government of the member States (Burundi, the Democratic Republic of Congo (DRC) and Rwanda), as well as their respective national utility companies on negotiating the agreements for the Ruzizi III hydroelectric power plant project.
Advising the French State on the concession of the CDG Express railway infrastructure (June 2019).
Advising the Republic of Côte d'Ivoire on drafting the Code of Construction and Habitat (January 2019).
Advising Casino Group on the sale of 26 hypermarket and supermarket properties worth EUR 501 million (January 2019).
Advising CDC Habitat on acquiring in consortium 80% of Foncière Vesta. This is the most significant operation in 2018 in terms of volume on the residential segment of the property asset class (October 2018).
Advising AccorHotels on the sale of 57.8% of the capital of AccorInvest (June 2018).
Record fine for Google: Gide, counsel to Twenga, one of the complainants (June 2017).
Represented Pernod Ricard in its €5.6 billion acquisition of the V&S Group including Absolut Vodka from the Government of Sweden (March 2008).
Legal counsel to The Linde Group as to French law in its €4 billion sale of its forklift division to Kohlberg Kravis Roberts & Co and Goldman Sachs (November 2006).
Counsel to AIG Infrastructure Funds LLC in its $230 disposal of a stake in Orascom Telecom Algeria (April 2006).
Legal counsel to the government of France on corporate and antitrust matters in the €73 billion merger of Gaz de France and Suez (February 2006).
Advised the Government of France as shareholder of Air France in its €784 million merger with Dutch airlines KLM (September 2003).

References

External links
Official site

Law firms of France
Law firms established in 1957
Foreign law firms with offices in the United States
1957 establishments in France